The HMPAC Puffin was a British man-powered aircraft designed by a team headed by John Wimpenny, an aerodynamicist at the de Havilland Aircraft Company. It was built by the Hatfield Man Powered Aircraft Club (HMPAC) on the company's premises in Hatfield, Hertfordshire.

Puffin II
An improved version of the Puffin was developed and built in 1965 as the HMPAC Puffin II. First flown on 27 August 1965, the Puffin II utilized the transmission components of the Puffin I in a completely new airframe.

After it had been damaged, the Puffin II airframe was given to Liverpool University, who used it to build the Liverpuffin.

Specifications

See also
 Malliga 1
 SUMPAC
 List of human-powered aircraft

References

Further reading

External links
 Flight archive 
 THE FIRST TRUE FLIGHTS

1960s British experimental aircraft
Aircraft first flown in 1961
Human-powered aircraft
Puffin
Single-engined pusher aircraft
Shoulder-wing aircraft